Chorin is a municipality in the district of Barnim in Brandenburg, Germany. It is most famous for its cloister and for being situated within the Schorfheide-Chorin Biosphere Reserve. It is famous for its medieval Brick Gothic Chorin Abbey and the Choriner Musiksommer music festival held there.

Demography

See also 
Amtssee

References

External links 

Chorin at britz-chorin-oderberg.de (German infopage)
www.Kloster-Chorin.info (German website about Chorin Abbey)

Localities in Barnim